Nigel Fleming (born 17 August 1951) is a former Zimbabwean cricket umpire. He stood in one ODI game between Zimbabwe and Sri Lanka in November 1994.

See also
 List of One Day International cricket umpires

References

1951 births
Living people
Zimbabwean One Day International cricket umpires
Cricketers from Mutare